Amo – Capitolo I is the 27th studio album by Renato Zero. It was released on 12 March 2013.

The album is about love, friendship and memories. The tracks of love are : Il nostro mondo, Voglia d'amare, Oramai and Vola Alto. Then, there are track like Chiedi di me, Una canzone da cantare avrai, Angelina, Lu, I '70, Un'apertura d'ali talk about Renato's memories and friends of the past (like Lucio Dalla, Giancarlo Bigazzi and Angelina, the concierge of the palace where Renato lived as a young man).

On 1 March 2013, the first single from the album, "Chiedi di me", was released. The album was certified platinum by the Federation of the Italian Music Industry.

Track listing

Musicians
Renato Zero – vocals
Danilo Madonia – piano, backing vocals, keyboards, programming, accordion
Massimo Varini – acoustic guitar, electric guitar
Phil Palmer – acoustic guitar, electric guitar
Giorgio Secco – acoustic guitar, electric guitar
Samuele Dessì – acoustic guitar, electric guitar
Paolo Valli – drums
Tommy Ruggero – percussions
Julian Hinton – keyboards, organ, piano, programming
Trevor Horn – bass
Cesare Chiodo – bass
Lele Melotti – drums
Paolo Costa – bass
Danilo Rea – piano
Tom Sheret – soprano saxophone
Fabrizio Bosso – trumpet
Simon Bloor – organ
Luis Jardim – percussions
Everton Nelson – first violin
Anselmo Cerriana – first violin
Marco Ferrari – second violin
Beppe Francese – viola
Giulio Glavina – cello
Elio Venali – contrabass
Paola Montanari – backing vocals
Paolo Foti – backing vocals
Rinaldo Zuliani – backing vocals
Antonio Mameli – backing vocals
Giuliano Mazzini – backing vocals
Cesidio Iacobone – backing vocals

References

Renato Zero albums
2013 albums
Italian-language albums